Aliff Shafaein Safiee (born 19 April 1982) is a Singaporean footballer who plays as a midfielder for S.League club Home United. He can be small but with his brilliant pace and style of play he can be dangerous for defenders. Due to his ball-control skills, he was nicknamed "Romario of the Young Lions". He also had another nickname, "The Little Master".

International career 
Aliff was part of the Singapore Under-23 national team.

References

External links

Living people
1982 births
Singaporean footballers
Singapore international footballers
Association football midfielders
Tampines Rovers FC players
Tanjong Pagar United FC players
Warriors FC players
Home United FC players
Singapore Premier League players